Lois Miller may refer to:
 Lois K. Miller, American geneticist
 Lois Kelly Miller, Jamaican theater and screen actress